Trigonostoma gofasi is a species of sea snail, a marine gastropod mollusc in the family Cancellariidae, the nutmeg snails.

Description

Distribution

References

 Cossignani T. (2015). Trigonostoma damasoi sp. nov. Malacologia Mostra Mondiale. 88: 15-16

External links
 Verhecken, A. (2007). Revision of the Cancellariidae (Mollusca, Neogastropoda, Cancellarioidea) of the eastern Atlantic (40°N-40°S) and the Mediterranean. Zoosystema. 29(2): 281-364

Cancellariidae
Gastropods described in 2007